Chan Hao-ching and Chan Yung-jan were the defending champions, but they chose not to participate this year.

Kanae Hisami and Kotomi Takahata won the title, defeating Marina Melnikova and Elise Mertens in the final, 6–1, 6–2.

Seeds

Draw

References 
 Draw

2015 WTA 125K series
2015